King Sigismund of Poland may refer to: 

 Sigismund I the Old (1467–1548), King of Poland, Grand Duke of Lithuania
 Sigismund II Augustus (1520–1572), King of Poland, Grand Duke of Lithuania
 Sigismund III Vasa (1566–1632), King of Poland, Sweden and Grand Duke of Lithuania

See also
 Sigismund (disambiguation)